The 2019–20 Danish Superliga (officially the 3F Superliga for sponsorship reasons) was the 30th season of the Danish Superliga. F.C. Copenhagen were the defending champions. The season started on 12 July 2019 and was scheduled to end in May 2020, before being suspended due to the COVID-19 pandemic. The season instead ended on 29 July 2020.

Teams
Vejle Boldklub finished as loser in the relegation play-offs in the 2018–19 season and was relegated to the 2019–20 1st Division along with Vendsyssel FF who lost their relegation play-offs as well.

The relegated teams were replaced by 2018–19 1st Division champions Silkeborg IF, who returned after one year of absence, as well as the play-off winners Lyngby Boldklub who also returned after a one-year absence.

Stadia and locations

Personnel and sponsoring
Note: Flags indicate national team as has been defined under FIFA eligibility rules. Players and Managers may hold more than one non-FIFA nationality.

Managerial changes

Regular season

League table

Positions by round

Results

Championship round
Points and goals will carry over in full from the regular season.

Positions by round
Below the positions per round are shown. As teams did not all start with an equal number of points, the initial pre-playoffs positions are also given.

Relegation round
Points and goals will carry over in full from the regular season. Starting next season in the Superliga there will again be only 12 clubs.

Group A

Positions by round
Below the positions per round are shown. As teams did not all start with an equal number of points, the initial pre-playoffs positions are also given.

Group B

Positions by round
Below the positions per round are shown. As teams did not all start with an equal number of points, the initial pre-playoffs positions are also given.

European play-offs
The winning team from the 4-team knockout tournament advanced to a Europa League play-off match. In the final, the team with the most points from the relegation round group stage would host the second leg.

The match between Horsens and SønderjyskE was cancelled due to the latter's victory in the Danish Cup, which automatically qualified the team for Europa League and allowed Horsens to advance directly to the second round.

Quarter-finals

Semi-finals

European play-off match

Relegation play-offs
The two sides who finished 3rd in the relegation round will play a two-legged tie to determine who stays up and who is relegated to the 2020–21 Danish 1st Division.

Lyngby won 4–3 on aggregate. As a result Hobro was relegated, while Lyngby BK would remain in the Superliga in 2020-21.

Season statistics

Top scorers

Attendances

Due to the COVID-19 pandemic some games were played without spectators and some games were played with a reduced amount allowed.

References

External links
Superliga (uefa.com)

Danish Superliga seasons
Denmark
Superliga
Danish Superliga